Montezuma is a municipality in the northeast of the Brazilian state of Minas Gerais. It is isolated, and the inhabitants are poor, mainly engaged in cattle raising and small-scale farming. It became a municipality in 1993.

Location
Montezuma is part of the statistical microregion of Salinas. It is connected by poor roads to the regional center of Espinosa to the northwest. The municipality contains about 55% of the  Nascentes Geraizeiras Sustainable Development Reserve, created in 2014. The reserve protects an area of the cerrado biome.

Demographics
This is one of the poorest municipalities in the state and in the country. The main economic activities are cattle raising (7,000 head in 2006) and farming with modest production of sugarcane, corn, and rice. Cropland made up . There were only 18 tractors. In the urban area there were no financial institutions as of 2006. There were 116 automobiles, giving a ratio of about one automobile for every 62 inhabitants. Health care was provided by 3 public health clinics. There were no hospitals.

Human Development Index
Municipal Human Development Index: .589 (2000)
State ranking: 843 out of 853 municipalities as of 2000
National ranking: 4,853 out of 5,138 municipalities as of 2000
Life expectancy: 59
Literacy rate: 67 
Combined primary, secondary and tertiary gross enrolment ratio: .707
Per capita income (monthly): R$83.44 (For the complete list see Frigoletto)
Note that at last count Brazil had 5,561 municipalities while Minas Gerais still had 853.

The above figures can be compared with those of Poços de Caldas, which had an MHDI of .841, the highest in the state of Minas Gerais. The highest in the country was São Caetano do Sul in the state of São Paulo with an MHDI of .919. The lowest was Manari in the state of Pernambuco with an MHDI of .467 out of a total of 5,504 municipalities in the country as of 2004. At last count Brazil had 5,561 municipalities so this might have changed at the time of this writing.

See also
List of municipalities in Minas Gerais

References

Sources

Municipalities in Minas Gerais